No Reply is the debut full-length album by Daylight Dies released by Relapse Records in 2002.

Track listing

Credits
Guthrie Iddings – harsh vocals, piano (on track 8) 
Barre Gambling – guitars
Egan O'Rourke – bass, clean vocals
Jesse Haff – drums

References

Daylight Dies albums
2002 debut albums
Relapse Records albums
Albums with cover art by Travis Smith (artist)